Heavier Than a Death in the Family is a bootleg live album by Japanese noise rock band, Les Rallizes Dénudés. Most of the songs were recorded at a performance on 12 March 1977; the fifth track is taken from a 1973 performance. The album was released in 2002. In 2010, Phoenix Records repressed the album on vinyl and CD.

Background
Like most of the band's work, this album is a bootleg and wasn't authorized by the band for its release. The recordings are taken mostly from a performance at Shakai Kyoiku Kaikan on 12 March 1977 (as heard on a previous live album, '77 Live), except for "Field of Artificial Flowers" (mislabelled as "People Can Choose"), taken from a 1973 performance.

Reception
In a review for AllMusic, Phil Freeman writes that the "sound is primitive guitar rock à la the Velvet Underground crossed with the Troggs, but their simple guitar riffs are fed through so much reverb, fuzz, and echo that it's like a dub mix of psychedelic garage rock... it retains a primal rock & roll throb...[the album] is essential listening for anyone who wants to understand [the Japanese underground rock] scene."

It reached #3 on Julian Cope's top 50 albums of Japanese rock, as found in his 2007 non-fiction book Japrocksampler. Cope writes, "It's relentless to the point of becoming meditative, and cylindrical to the point of being useful".

Track listing

Personnel
Adapted from CD liner notes:
Mizutani – vocals, lead guitar
Nakamura Takeshi – guitar
Hiroshi – bass guitar
Mimaki Toshirou – drums

References

External links

2002 live albums
Bootleg recordings